Gretchen Stephens "Greta" Neubauer (born September 13, 1991) is an American politician.  A Democrat, she is the minority leader of the Wisconsin State Assembly; she has been a member of the Assembly since January 2018, representing the city of Racine and eastern Racine County.

Early life and education
Neubauer attended high school at The Prairie School in Wind Point, Wisconsin. As a student, she helped organize Racine High School Students for Barack Obama during the 2008 presidential campaign. After graduating from Middlebury College in Vermont with a degree in history, Neubauer became director of the nonprofit Fossil Fuel Divestment Student Network, focusing on environmental issues.

Career
In August 2017, Neubauer began working as an aide in the office of then-Representative Cory Mason. Neubauer had previously worked as an intern for Mason and considered him a mentor. During her time with Mason, Neubauer worked closely on the state budget and had a front row seat to the debate on the $2.85 billion incentive package to bring Foxconn to Mount Pleasant, Wisconsin.

Upon the announcement that Mason would resign from the state Assembly effective January 15, 2018 to serve as Mayor of Racine, Neubauer declared her candidacy to fill his seat. Neubauer defeated Racine Alderman John Tate II in the Democratic primary, and she was unopposed in the general election.

On October 24, 2019, Wisconsin Governor Tony Evers appointed Neubauer to the Governor's Task Force on Climate Change.  Following the announcement in 2021 that Democratic caucus leader Gordon Hintz would resign from party leadership, Neubauer was unanimously elected to serve as minority leader, starting with the 2022 floor session. Neubauer and incoming assistant minority leader, Kalan Haywood, will make up the youngest legislative leadership team in Wisconsin history.

Personal life
Neubauer is the daughter of Jeff Neubauer, a former state legislator and chairman of the Democratic Party of Wisconsin, and Lisa Neubauer, a judge of the Wisconsin Court of Appeals. In a Racine Journal Times op-ed on June 27, 2020, Neubauer came out as queer.

Electoral history

| colspan="6" style="text-align:center;background-color: #e9e9e9;"| Democratic Primary, December 19, 2017

| colspan="6" style="text-align:center;background-color: #e9e9e9;"| Special Election, January 16, 2018

| colspan="6" style="text-align:center;background-color: #e9e9e9;"| General Election, November 6, 2018

| colspan="6" style="text-align:center;background-color: #e9e9e9;"| General Election, November 3, 2020

References

External links
 
 
 Official website 
 Representative Greta Neubauer at Wisconsin Legislature

|-

1991 births
21st-century American politicians
21st-century American women politicians
LGBT state legislators in Wisconsin
LGBT people from Wisconsin
Living people
Democratic Party members of the Wisconsin State Assembly
Middlebury College alumni
Politicians from Racine, Wisconsin
Queer women
Women state legislators in Wisconsin